Botond Király (born 26 October 1994) is a Hungarian professional footballer who plays for Pápa.

Club statistics

Updated to games played as of 6 December 2014.

References

1994 births
People from Pápa
Sportspeople from Veszprém County
Living people
Hungarian footballers
Association football midfielders
Lombard-Pápa TFC footballers
Rákosmenti KSK players
Vasas SC players
Csákvári TK players
Győri ETO FC players
Nemzeti Bajnokság I players
Nemzeti Bajnokság II players
Nemzeti Bajnokság III players